William Zuill (29 April 1900 – 1960) was a football (soccer) goalkeeper who represented New Zealand at international level.

In his native England he played for Christian Brethren FC before signing for Mossley and played six games for them in 1923–24 season. He later emigrated to New Zealand.

Zuill played three official A-international matches for the All Whites in 1933, all on tour against trans-Tasman neighbours Australia, the first a 2–4 loss on 5 June 1933, followed by a 4–6 loss and another 2–4 loss on 17 and 24 June respectively.

References

1900 births
1960 deaths
New Zealand association footballers
New Zealand international footballers
Association football goalkeepers
Footballers from Salford
Mossley A.F.C. players